The Precision 185, also called the Precision 185K (for keel), is an American trailerable sailboat that was designed by Jim Taylor as a day sailer and first built in 2001.

There is also a centerboard sailing dinghy derivative of the design, the Precision 185 CB, which was named Sailing World's 2003 Boat of the Year.

Production
The design was built by Precision Boat Works in Palmetto, Florida, United States, between 2001 and 2018, but it is now out of production.

Design
The Precision 185 is a recreational keelboat, built predominantly of fiberglass, with wood trim. It has a fractional sloop rig, a raked stem, an open plumb transom, a transom-hung rudder controlled by a tiller and a fixed fin keel. It displaces  and carries  of ballast.

See also
List of sailing boat types

References

External links

Keelboats
2000s sailboat type designs
Sailing yachts
Trailer sailers
Sailboat type designs by Jim Taylor Yacht Designs
Sailboat types built by Precision Boat Works